Sofia Ivanovna Muratova (13 July 1929 – 25 September 2006) was a Soviet gymnast. She competed in the 1956 and 1960 Olympics and won eight medals.

Early life

Muratova grew up in Leningrad and lost her mother during its siege. Muratova herself was evacuated from the city in 1941. During the war she could not regularly attend school, but tried to train every day. She took up artistic gymnastics in 1943, entering a children's sports school, and just three months later competed in the Russian Championships for girls. In 1944 she moved to Moscow, where she trained under Igor Zhuravlev.

First successes
In 1945 Muratova won her first major competition, the USSR Junior Championships. She soon became one of the strongest Soviet gymnasts, the only one to win five Soviet all-around titles, yet she was often unlucky at major international events.

World championships and Olympics

Muratova missed the 1952 Summer Olympics due to injury. Two years later, at the 1954 World Championships in Artistic Gymnastics, she won a gold medal in the team competition and led the all-around contest, but broke her arm during a warm-up and had to withdraw from the championship. Her husband Valentin Muratov swore to win a gold medal for her and became the all-around champion. She debuted at the 1956 Summer Olympics, winning the team gold and two bronze medals, all-around and on the uneven bars. At the rather unsuccessful 1958 World Championships in Artistic Gymnastics in Moscow Muratova won the team gold and two bronzes on vault and balance beam. Injuries haunted her on the way to the 1960 Summer Olympics, but with the help from Zoya Mironova, who operated Muratova just three months before the Olympics, she managed to recover and even win three medals — the team gold, all-around silver and bronze on the balance beam. She presented her gold medal to Mironova as a token of gratitude. Her two Olympic all-around medals (1956, 1960) were a rare feat accomplished by only eight other women gymnasts.

Muratova won seven all-around national titles, including the inaugural 1955 USSR Cup. She retired in 1965 and worked as a coach for 34 years. She was the head coach of the Soviet women's gymnastics team at the 1968 Olympics. Earlier in 1957 she was awarded the Order of the Red Banner of Labour. Muratova died on 25 September 2006. Her husband Valentin Muratov died on 6 October of the same year.

Achievements (non-Olympic)

See also
List of multiple Summer Olympic medalists

References

1929 births
2006 deaths
Soviet female artistic gymnasts
Gymnasts at the 1956 Summer Olympics
Gymnasts at the 1960 Summer Olympics
Olympic gold medalists for the Soviet Union
Olympic silver medalists for the Soviet Union
Olympic bronze medalists for the Soviet Union
Olympic gymnasts of the Soviet Union
Medalists at the World Artistic Gymnastics Championships
Dynamo sports society athletes
Gymnasts from Saint Petersburg
Olympic medalists in gymnastics
Medalists at the 1960 Summer Olympics
Medalists at the 1956 Summer Olympics